The New Castle Range Rear Light is a lighthouse in Delaware, 
United States, on the Delaware River near New Castle, Delaware.

History
This range was constructed in 1876 to mark the main channel past Pea Patch Island and Bulkhead Shoal; it took its name from the town, somewhat to the northeast of the lights. The rear tower was integral to its dwelling, a two-story frame house, and was located on a 1-acre plot half a mile from the front light. It was supplanted by a steel skeleton tower in 1953, but the original house remained standing until deliberately burned in 1982 after falling into disrepair and a previous fire in 1975.

Notes

Lighthouses completed in 1876
Lighthouses in New Castle County, Delaware